William Joseph Wenzel Jr. (March 22, 1924 – April 14, 1999), known as Bill Wendell, was an NBC television staff announcer for almost his entire professional career.

Life and career
Born in New York City, Wendell served in the United States Army Air Corps during World War II and graduated from Fordham University with a degree in speech. He began his radio career in summer of 1947 at WHAM in Rochester, New York. He moved to WWJ in Detroit, where he worked in both radio and TV. Wendell returned to Manhattan in 1952 when he landed a job on the DuMont television network emceeing several shows before jumping to NBC in 1955.

He was a regular on the 1955-56 version of The Ernie Kovacs Show, serving as the show's announcer, as well as a participant in sketches such as "Mr. Question Man" (a parody of The Answer Man). He also worked with Steve Allen, Jack Paar, Dave Garroway, and other NBC personalities. After Jack Barry was implicated in the quiz show scandals, Wendell succeeded him as emcee of Tic Tac Dough on October 13, 1958, until the show was finally canceled in October 1959. By December, Wendell had resumed his staff announcing position at NBC, forming part of a fraternity of network staff announcers who held lifetime contracts; his colleagues were Don Pardo, Wayne Howell, Gene Hamilton, Ben Grauer, Fred Facey, Bill McCord, Roger Tuttle, and Howard Reig.

During the 1970s, Wendell succeeded Johnny Olson as the announcer of the syndicated To Tell the Truth from 1972 to 1977, after Olson left New York City to assume the job on CBS's game The New Price Is Right, based in Southern California. Wendell was also the announcer for several years on Sale of the Century and the Macy's Thanksgiving Day Parade. In addition, during the years when the television networks did not broadcast 24 hours a day, Wendell anchored a five-minute summary of the day's news—the last program NBC-TV would offer to its local affiliates at the end of the broadcast day. Wendell was heard but not seen, as the camera displayed still images or illustrations related to the brief news items. 

He was David Letterman's announcer, beginning partway through the short-lived morning program The David Letterman Show in 1980.  He continued with Letterman as the regular announcer for NBC's Late Night with David Letterman from 1982 to 1993, the entirety of the show's NBC run. In addition to his duties as announcer, Wendell occasionally participated in sketches, usually playing himself. He moved with Letterman to CBS in 1993, staying as announcer on the Late Show with David Letterman.

Wendell retired in mid-1995, with his last episode airing on August 18. Following a two-week hiatus, Alan Kalter succeeded him as announcer on September 4.  Kalter had previously replaced Wendell as announcer for the final season of To Tell the Truth in 1977–78. Before he announced for David Letterman's Late Night, Wendell was announcer on Tom Snyder's Tomorrow Show when Snyder moved production from Burbank, California to New York. Snyder's time slot was later given to Letterman, who kept Wendell as announcer.

On the June 14, 2018 episode of The Carson Podcast with guest Robert Morton (Producer of The Late Show), Morton claimed that "I fired Wendell because he was stealing water [bottled water intended for the staff]. One day I see Wendell walking out with a case of water. When we caught him doing it a second time, we all said, 'We can't tolerate this.' He was a wonderful announcer and a good guy, but he was petty."

Wendell also appeared as a TV announcer in the movie Mr. Saturday Night, which starred Billy Crystal. Wendell's last major job was as the original voiceover announcer in Old Navy's "fashion show" commercial campaign.

Death
Wendell died of complications from cancer in 1999 in Boca Raton, Florida.

References

Obituaries
 Obituary in The New York Times, April 15, 1999.
 Obituary in Variety, May 25, 1999.

External links
 

1924 births
1999 deaths
Deaths from cancer in Florida
Fordham University alumni
Game show announcers
NBC network announcers
NBCUniversal people
Television personalities from New York City
Radio and television announcers
United States Army Air Forces soldiers
United States Army Air Forces personnel of World War II
People from New York City